Suseo is a station on the Seoul Subway Line 3 and Suin–Bundang Line. It was the southeastern terminus of Line 3, until the Line 3 extension to Ogeum station opened on February 18, 2010. Along with Yangjae Station, this station serves as an important transfer point between Line 3 and buses from/to southern cities such as Seongnam, Yongin, and Suwon.

Both Line 3 and Bundang Line stations are located in Suseo-dong, Gangnam-gu, Seoul. In December 2016, it became the northern connection point to the Suseo–Pyeongtaek high-speed railway Line running SRT.

Meanwhile, construction of Line A of the metropolitan express railway is underway, and it is scheduled to open in 2024. It will join the Suseo Pyeongtaek Express Line at GTX Suseo Station. In the future, Bundang Line Station plans to install evacuation lines on the platform as part of the express train operation. The Suseo Pyeongtaek Express Line is an underground section from this station to Dongtan Station. One flight will stay late at night on subway line 3 in the Seoul metropolitan area. Also, the SRT is staying late at night with 11 episodes.

Services

SRT
Suseo Station is the terminus of All SRT trains including:

 All trains that run Suseo–Pyeongtaek high-speed railway and directly to Daejeon, Daegu, and Busan by the Gyeongbu High-speed Railway
 All trains that run Suseo–Pyeongtaek high-speed railway and directly to Iksan, Gwangju-songjeong, and Mokpo by the Honam High-speed Railway

Seoul Subway 
Seoul Subway serves the station with Line 3 and Suin–Bundang Line.

GTX
The GTX-A line linking Dongtan to Unjeong will be opened in 2024.

Station layout

SRT platforms

Seoul Metro platforms (Line 3)

Korail platforms (Suin–Bundang Line)

Gallery

Exits

References

External links
 Station information from Korail

Seoul Metropolitan Subway stations
Metro stations in Gangnam District
Railway stations opened in 1993
Seoul Subway Line 3